Adirondack Life is a bi-monthly magazine based in Jay, New York that covers the Adirondack region of the state. It has been published since 1969 when it began as a supplement to a Warrensburg, New York newspaper.

Articles are primarily oriented towards features on the history and culture of the region, as well as recreational opportunities. The magazine also runs an annual photography contest and publishes the winning entries both in the magazine itself and on its website. It also publishes and sells annual wall and engagement calendars.

References

External links
Magazine's website

Adirondacks
Bimonthly magazines published in the United States
Local interest magazines published in the United States
Magazines established in 1969
Magazines published in New York (state)
Newspaper supplements